Kill No Albatross (formerly Gatling) was a Canadian band formed by Alexander Sallas and Alex Crosty in November 2007 in Burlington, Ontario. Their music is associated with progressive metal and alternative rock, though there are ambient, post-hardcore, and jazz influences as well. The band is noted for having two songs in the Rock Band video game series: "Nihilanth"  and "Absolute,"  the former being one of the hardest guitar songs in the game with a section topping 25 notes per second. Their song "The Disguise" was featured regularly on CFRB's The Richard Syrett Show before the show was discontinued. Their debut full-length album, Beforemath, was released independently, despite record label interest, in April 2012.

Discography 

EPs
2009: Resonance Cascade [Demo] 
2010: Hen In A Pumpkin
2011: Absolute EP
2013: Passiveclimactic
2017: Lost in Darkness and Distance
2018: Speak True Evil
Studio albums
2012: Beforemath

References

External links

Canadian progressive rock groups
Canadian progressive metal musical groups
Canadian post-hardcore musical groups
Canadian alternative rock groups
Canadian ambient music groups
Musical groups established in 2007
Musical quintets
2007 establishments in Ontario